Julia Davis (born 25 February 1941) is a British fencer. She competed in the women's team foil event at the 1968 Summer Olympics.

References

1941 births
Living people
British female fencers
Olympic fencers of Great Britain
Fencers at the 1968 Summer Olympics
Sportspeople from Cardiff